Aaru is a 2005 Indian Tamil-language action gangster film written and directed by Hari. It stars Suriya in the main lead role as Aarumugam (aka Aaru). The film's score and soundtrack were composed by Devi Sri Prasad. The film released on 9 December 2005. It received mixed reviews and became a commercial success.

Plot
  
Aarumugam, known as Aaru, is a thug and dealmaker with a band of boys handpicked from the slums of Chennai. Aaru was just a child when his parents died on different occasions. Being an orphan, he was brought up by Vishwanathan's little sister. Aaru is very devoted to Vishwanathan, whom he respects as his brother, and is ready to go miles for keeping him the most powerful person in Chennai. Vishwanathan protects Aaru because the latter gives him the violent undercover that he needs, but otherwise sees him as just his servant. When Vishwanathan declares war on his bitter rival Reddy, Aaru assists him. In the process, he is attacked by Reddy's goons, but he overpowers this attempt. Things were going on smoothly when Aaru has to help Vishwanathan on an errand in protecting a girl from being dragged into a hit-and-run case. This is where he meets Mahalakshmi. Later on, Mahalakshmi puts forward her proposal by kissing him in public. Shocked by this act, Aaru insults and slaps her. Upon realizing who provoked her to do so, Aaru slaps Lingam and reprimands him. Meanwhile, Vishwanathan plots to kill Aaru's friends during a protest which was organised by him. Aaru leaves the protest midway, having realized his mistake and goes to invite Maha to his life and to try to talk to her. She declines, saying it is the love out of the pity of him slapping her, which she does not want. Maha gives him two months time to change and orders him to stay away from her to test his loyalty and love. Heartbroken, Aaru accepts her decision and leaves in tears.

Aaru's friends are burnt alive during the protest as there was petrol and kerosene mixed together, even though Aaru had only requested kerosene. Aaru, filled with regret, vows to take revenge on those who did it. One day, Lingam utters Bhaskar's (Vishwanathan's assistant) name, as he had seen Bhaskar light the petrol and kerosene on fire. Aaru, immediately suspicious, tries to confront Vishwanthan, who claims Reddy did it. However, the two of them (Vishwanathan and Reddy) come to a mutual deal to finish off Aaru in exchange for Reddy to have free rein over parts of Chennai as well as kidnapping and murdering young girls.

Aaru confronts Reddy and almost kills him, until Reddy tells him the truth and calls Vishwanathan and tells him, "I killed Aaru". Vishwanathan celebrates with joy and tells Reddy that he has free rein and to chop Aaru's body and throw it to the vultures. Betrayed, Aaru slices Reddy's neck and rages at Vishwanathan, realizing his true, evil nature and vows to destroy his power.

Aaru kidnaps Jaganathan, youngest brother of Vishwanathan, and slices his hand. Challenging Vishwanathan, he tells him to save who he can, as he will not spare anyone. Rajavelu, the corrupt brother-in-law of Vishwanathan, who is a police officer and has a conflict with Aaru, obtains a shooting order to shoot Aaru at sight, swearing to murder him.

Aaru forms a plan to attack Bhoominathan, the next brother of Vishwanathan, who also insulted and degraded Aaru many times. During a property registration, Aaru and his men break into the registrar office masked, and Aaru personally slices Bhoominathan 25 times all over his body and runs away. Rajavel tries to catch him when they run in the forest and misses him, but not before he fires a bullet into Aaru's shoulder, weakening him and putting all hospitals on alert. Maha's friend treats Aaru at her friend's house, and Maha sees Aaru's love for her and realizes how much he needs her. She confesses her love for him and promises to stand by him at all costs. Aaru, overfilled with joy, decides to continue their relationship.

Aaru calls Vishwanathan and torments him regarding Bhoominathan's plight, causing Vishwanathan to unplug the machine providing life to Bhoomi, killing him. Vishwanathan kills many of Aaru's allies while Rajavelu arrests Maha and a female police officer harasses her in the station for helping Aaru, hoping for Aaru to surrender himself to save Maha's dignity. Enraged, Aaru challenges Rajavelu to arrest him directly if he is a man. Aaru breaks into the police station while Rajavelu is out of the station and takes Maha to safety. Loganathan and Bhaskar follow behind to finish Aaru off, but Aaru sends her off safely in a boat to Sri Lanka, ensuring her safety.

Loganathan and Bhaskar engage in combat with Aaru, but he overpowers them both and nearly burns them until Loganathan begs him not to by saying, "I am like your brother." Aaru then tells Loganathan to finish off Bhaskar as Bhaskar is hesitant due to their many years of friendship. Loganathan burns Bhaskar alive, but Bhaskar angrily runs into Loganathan, making him catch on fire, and they both die.

Vishwanathan, having realized that he is the only one remaining, decides to face Aaru. Rajavelu pretends to arrest Aaru at a police mission with other officers and beats him up. A nearly unconscious Aaru overhears Rajavelu telling Vishwanathan that Aaru is in his hands and that Vishwanathan can come and finish off Aaru. Realizing that Rajavelu is tricking everyone, Aaru wakes up and brutally beats Rajavelu up, tying him to a tree and punching him unconscious. Vishwanathan comes and engages in combat with Aaru, but Aaru defeats him and overpowers him.

Aaru reprimands Vishwanathan for his acts and says that he is not going to kill him, but make him suffer for eternity. He will need everyone's help for anything he does. Shocked, Vishwanathan does not realize what is about to happen until Aaru cuts off his arm, making him scream in pain. Horrified, Rajavelu begs Aaru to stop, but Aaru refuses and cuts off Vishwanathan's other arm and tells him that at least now Vishwanathan should realize the pain felt by those who were burnt and betrayed. Rajavelu, realizing Aaru is right, looks at Aaru in shock as Aaru surrenders to him.

Aaru serves his jail term and is released and reunites with Maha. He bids goodbye to his friends, telling them to find proper jobs and leave rowdyism. He tells them he is going to Trichy to try and make a new life. In reality, Aaru and Maha leave for Pune to start their new lives, and they joke and embrace on the way to the train, thus turning a new leaf.

Cast

Production
After directing Ayya, director Hari announced his next project Aaru with Suriya. The film was launched and shooting was started in July 2005. Director Saran made his debut as a producer in this film by floating a production house "Gemini Productions", named after the Tamil film Gemini (2002).

Soundtrack
The soundtrack was composed by Devi Sri Prasad and released by Star Music in India and Ayngaran in other international territories. The album was made up of 6 tracks. The audio was launched in a soft manner.

Release
The film was given an "A" certificate by the Indian Censor Board due to excessive violence. The film was released on 9 December 2005 alongside Vetrivel Sakthivel, Sandakozhi. After the success of  Ghajini, Surya has an opening similar to as Aaru releases with approximately 171 prints in Tamil Nadu, the opening weekend tickets for Surya's Aaru have been sold out in Chennai city theatres.

Reception

Critical response

Sify wrote:"Aaru offers neither insight nor content-just unmitigated violence".IndiaGlitz rated 3.5 out of 5 stars stating "Devi Sri Prasad's suits the mood and metaphors of the movie. Hari has a way with mass entertainers. We saw that in films like Saamy and Thamizh. Now he has had another go at it".

References

External links
 

2005 films
2000s masala films
Films shot in Ooty
Films directed by Hari (director)
2005 action thriller films
2000s Tamil-language films
Films scored by Devi Sri Prasad
Films set in Tamil Nadu
Indian action thriller films
Films set in Chennai
Films shot in Chennai
Films shot in Jordan